Dixeia doxo, the black-veined white, is a butterfly in the family Pieridae and is native to southern Africa.

Wingspan is 34–40 mm in males and 36–42 mm in females. Flight period is year-round.

Larvae feed on Capparis species.

Subspecies
Listed alphabetically.
D. d. alberta (Grünberg, 1912) (eastern Democratic Republic of the Congo, central and north-central Tanzania)
D. d. costata Talbot, 1943 (Uganda, western Kenya, coast of Tanzania)
D. d. doxo (Senegal, Burkina Faso, northern Ghana, northern Nigeria to western Sudan)
D. d. parva Talbot, 1943 (Malawi, Zambia, Mozambique, Zimbabwe, South Africa)
D. d. venatus (Butler, 1871) (south-western Ethiopia, southern Sudan)

References

Seitz, A. Die Gross-Schmetterlinge der Erde 13: Die Afrikanischen Tagfalter. Plate XIII 14

Butterflies described in 1819
Pierini
Butterflies of Africa
Taxa named by Jean-Baptiste Godart